Burrenwood is a cottage orné or country house and estate near Castlewellan, County Down, Northern Ireland.

History
The ornamental wooded and cottaged demesne at Burrenwood was conceived by Theodosia Hawkins-Magill (5 September 1743- 2 March 1817), the Countess of Clanwilliam, a great Ulster heiress and landowner, the daughter and heir of Robert Hawkins-Magill, of Gill Hall, Dromore, Co. Down. Having inherited her father's estates centred on Dromore and Rathfriland, as a child in 1747, she married Sir John Meade, 4th Bart., (Meade was ennobled in 1766 & 1776), in 1765.

It lies on some land conveniently half way between Theodosia Clanwilliam's mother's famous new house at Castle Ward, near Strangford Lough (the mother had married Bernard Ward after the early death of Robert Hawkins-Magill), the seventeenth century holdings of Alderman William Hawkins in and near Rathfriland, the infamous and similarly ancient Magill ancestral seat at Gill Hall, near Dromore, and the Greenore ferry which was caught by way of Newry, which at one time was plague ridden, avoidance of which is said to have been the incentive to build, in six weeks, the house by the Burren.

The Countess's second son, the General the Hon. Robert Meade (*29.2.1772–11.7.1852), Ensign in the 1st Foot (11.1787), Lt. Col. of the 31st Foot (wounded 1807), commander of forces in Madeira, Colonel of the 12th Regiment, Lt. General 4.6.1814, inherited the Rathfriland estate and the Burrenwood demesne which he extended; and it remained with his family for several further generations.
In 1808 he had married (20.6.1808) Anne Louise (d.1853), daughter and heir of the late General Sir John Dalling, 1st Bt.,  sometime Governor of Jamaica and later Commander in Chief at Madras. They had Robert (1809-); Theodosia (*27.1.1811-); John (*23.2.1812-); Louise; Anne; Catherine; Adelaide (*17.2.1818-), who married William Brownlow Forde (1823-1902), PC, MP, DL, JP, of Seaforde, in 1855; Rose (*8.1819-) and Caroline.

Burrenwood is comparable with the Swiss cottage at Cahir; Derrymore, Bessbrook, Newry, Co. Armagh (National Trust);  and the Petit hameau de la Reine at Versailles. All of which were in part inspired by Abbé Laugier, aka Marc-Antoine Laugier.
It lies between the forest parks of Lords Clanbrassill and Roden's Tollymore and Lord Annesley's Castlewellan, beside the Mourne mountains (the inspiration for C. S. Lewis's Narnia) and just inland from Dundrum bay at Newcastle.

References

Ulster Architectural Heritage Society: Historic buildings, groups of buildings, areas of architectural importance: In the Mourne area of South Down, P. J. Rankin, May 1975 (page 41).
Mark Bence-Jones, A Guide to Irish Country Houses, Constable, 1988.
Grace Dorothea Meade (1902–1977), (wife to Major John William Meade (1894–1984), transcript of one part of the BBC's: Houses of Ulster, Sunday, 21 November 1937.
Valerie Pakenham, The Big House in Ireland, Cassell & Co., 2000. (Has pictures of aristocratic cottages, but nothing directly relevant).

External links
Hawkins-Magill & Meade history from the Public Record Office of Northern Ireland (PRONI): A.P.W. Malcolmson & Peter Houston.
Alternative link to the above info.
The Complete Peerage, ed. G. E. Cokayne, volume III.
Groves-Raines Architects. Photos of the north front. As above.
Ulster Architectural Heritage Society, from their publication of 1975.
Castle Ward
Derrymore
Ulster Museum's 1765 Reynolds portrait of Theodosia Magill.
Ulster Museum's 1765 Gainsborough portrait of Theodosia Magill.

Buildings and structures in County Down
Country houses in Northern Ireland